Eva Margareta Velander (born 13 August 1924), also known as Meta Velander, is a Swedish actress.

Velander grew up in Kungsholmen in Stockholm, close to Rålambshovsparken, where she lived until she was twenty-one.

She started acting in plays during her school years. After studying at Dramatens school between 1947 and 1950, she started working at Uppsala Stadsteater, where she remained until 1957. She then worked at Stockholms stadsteater from 1960 until the present day. She presented episodes of Sommar i P1 at Sveriges Radio in 1982 and 2010.

She is the daughter of professor Edy Velander and Maj Halle. She married actor Ingvar Kjellson on 22 June 1949 and remained married to him until his death in 2014. She now lives in Djursholm, where she was born.

References

External links

1924 births
20th-century Swedish actresses
Living people
Actresses from Stockholm